AXI or variation, may refer to:

 Automated X-ray inspection
 Advanced eXtensible Interface of ARM for Advanced Microcontroller Bus Architecture (AMBA)
 AXI car, the right-hand-drive version of the DMC DeLorean
 Aeron International Airlines (ICAO airline code: AXI), see List of airline codes (A)
 Axitinib (PDB code AXI)
 AxiCorp GmbH, a German pharmaceutical company, subsidiary of Biocon
 S55 Axi Expressway, see List of Regional Expressways of China
 Axi, Qaka, Xinjiang, China; a village
 Axi Township, Zoigê County, Ngawa, Sichuan, China; see List of township-level divisions of Sichuan
 Axi language, a Loloish language spoken by the Yi people
 Axi Stachowitsch (1918–2013), Austrian-Russian academic
 Robert Axi, 15th century Member of Parliament in England
 "axi-", a term pertaining to axis; see List of Greek and Latin roots in English/A–G

See also

 Capsicum axi (C. axi), a species of chilli
 Trilobodrilus axi (T. axi), a species of bristleworm
 1AXI, a protein configuration of Growth hormone 1
 2AXI, a protein configuration of Mdm2
 Axi-cel, a treatment for large B-cell lymphoma
 Axi-Shield
 
 
 axis (disambiguation)
 Ax1 (disambiguation)
 Axl (disambiguation)